The Carlyle Hotel, known formally as The Carlyle, A Rosewood Hotel, is a combination luxury apartment hotel located at 35 East 76th Street on the northeast corner of Madison Avenue and East 76th Street, on the Upper East Side of Manhattan in New York City. Opened in 1930, the hotel was designed by Dorothy Draper, in the Art Deco style and was named after Scottish essayist Thomas Carlyle.

Owned since 2001 by Rosewood Hotels & Resorts, the Carlyle is a cooperative with 190 rental rooms and suites, and 60 privately owned residences.

Out of the Depression
The Carlyle was built by Moses Ginsberg, maternal grandfather of Rona Jaffe. Designed by architects Sylvan Bien and Harry M. Prince, it opened as an apartment hotel, with apartments costing up to $1 million a year. Apartment hotels had become increasingly popular since World War I. As the economy boomed and skyscrapers rose, New York was transforming so quickly that owning a townhouse began to fall out of fashion. The new thirty-five floor hotel "was to be a masterpiece in the modern idiom, in which shops and restaurants on the lower floors would give residents the convenience and comforts of a community skyscraper".

However, by the time the Carlyle was ready to open its doors in 1930, the 1929 stock market crash had started the Great Depression. The new hotel struggled, went into receivership in 1931, and was sold to the Lyleson Corporation in 1932. The new owners kept the original management, which was able to dramatically improve the property's financial situation through maintaining high occupancy and rates favorable to the hotel's costs. However, the hotel's reputation at this time was "staid rather than ritzy".

The next postwar boom allowed the hotel to take on new high-society prominence. In 1948, New York businessman Robert Whittle Dowling purchased the Carlyle and began to transform it from a "respectable" address to a "downright fashionable" one, frequented by elegant Europeans. That year, Harry S. Truman became the first president to visit the Carlyle; each of his successors through Bill Clinton followed.

Rise to prominence
The Carlyle became known as "the New York White House" during the administration of President John F. Kennedy, who maintained an apartment on the 34th floor for the last ten years of his life. He stayed at the apartment in a well-publicized visit for a few days just prior to his inauguration in January 1961. Marilyn Monroe was snuck in through the service entrance on East 77th Street. After famously singing "Happy Birthday, Mr. President" at Kennedy's birthday gala at Madison Square Garden on May 19, 1962, Monroe reportedly used a warren of tunnels to enter the Carlyle secretly with Kennedy and friends. The New York Post reported a Mob smear campaign plot on Robert F. Kennedy planned as an informant passed on information that a Mrs. Jacqueline Hammond had information on the sex-capade; however, the Post article stated "An FBI summary of the documents released yesterday said the bureau didn't consider the Milwaukee and Hammond information 'solid'". Years later, longtime bellman Michael O'Connell recalled, "Those tunnels. President Kennedy knew more about the tunnels than I did".

The Carlyle was the last place John F. Kennedy Jr. ate breakfast before departing on his ill-fated plane trip to Martha's Vineyard with his wife and her sister.

The Council for United Civil Rights Leadership (CUCRL) was organized in a meeting held at the Carlyle. Malcolm X expressed his concerns with having a white man in charge of this new fundraising organization during a November 10, 1963, speech, "Message to the Grass Roots". He described the hotel (rather than just one suite) as being owned by the Kennedy family.

In 1967, the hotel was purchased by a partnership of Jerome L. Greene, Norman L. Peck, and Peter Jay Sharp. The hotel is the source of the name for The Carlyle Group, as it was the location where that firm's founders first met in the mid-1980s.

Despite its brushes with history, the hotel retained a reputation for discretion. In June 2000, The New York Times called it a "Palace of Secrets". The hotel was the subject of a 2018 documentary film by writer-director Matthew Miele, Always at The Carlyle.

Entertainment and dining
The hotel's Café Carlyle has featured a number of well-known jazz performers – notably George Feyer from 1955 to 1968, and Bobby Short from 1968 to 2004. Woody Allen and his jazz band have played weekly at the café since 1996. According to New York Times writer Joe Heller, Mick Jagger maintains a residence at the Carlyle to use when he visits New York. Alan Cumming gave a series of concerts at the Café Carlyle in June 2015; the album of the performance, Alan Cumming Sings Sappy Songs features a photograph of a nude Cumming flanked by a male and a female model, also nude, shot in the doorway of the cafe.

The Café Carlyle is noted for the murals by Marcel Vertès, which were cleaned in the summer of 2007 as part of a renovation and redecoration of the café. Interior designer Scott Salvator oversaw the renovation and redecoration, the first significant alterations to the café since its debut in 1955. During the renovations the café closed for three months and was widely praised after reopening in September 2007. Salvator removed the dropped acoustical ceiling, exposing two feet of newly found space which allowed for a modern sound and a lighting system to appeal to a younger generation.

Bemelmans Bar is decorated with murals depicting Madeline in Central Park painted by Ludwig Bemelmans. Bemelmans is the namesake of the bar, and his murals there are his only artwork on display to the public. Instead of accepting payment for his work, Bemelmans received a year and a half of accommodations at the Carlyle for himself and his family. The 2015 film A Very Murray Christmas was set in the Carlyle and in Bemelmans Bar.

The Carlyle Restaurant was known as "Dumonet at the Carlyle" until 2005, named after its chef Jean-Louis Dumonet from 2001 until 2005.

Notes

References

Sources

External links
 

Art Deco hotels
Art Deco architecture in Manhattan
Hotels in Manhattan
Upper East Side